The Village is a novel by Mulk Raj Anand first published in 1939. This book was the first of a trilogy that included Across the Black Waters and The Sword and the Sickle. The plot centers on India's political structure, specifically the British rule and the independence movement. The novel revolves around Lal Singh a peasant in the Punjab, his antics going against social norms while in the village, his subsequent enrollment in the army and his troubles in the army, culminating in his return to the village.

References

Novels by Mulk Raj Anand
1939 novels
Novels set in India
Punjabi culture
Jonathan Cape books